Paracomitas haumuria is a species of sea snail, a marine gastropod mollusk in the family Pseudomelatomidae, the turrids and allies.

Distribution
This marine species is endemic to New Zealand and occurs off eastern South Island.

References

External links
 Beu, A. G. "Bathyal Nukumaruan Mollusca from Oaro, southern Marlborough, New Zealand." New Zealand journal of geology and geophysics 22.1 (1979): 87-103.

haumuria
Gastropods described in 1979
Gastropods of New Zealand